Criomorphus is a genus of delphacid planthoppers in the family Delphacidae. There are about 13 described species in Criomorphus.

Species
These 13 species belong to the genus Criomorphus:

 Criomorphus agnus Anufriev & Averkin, 1982
 Criomorphus albomarginatus Curtis, 1833
 Criomorphus borealis (Sahlberg, 1871)
 Criomorphus conspicuus Metcalf, 1932
 Criomorphus euagropyri Emeljanov, 1964
 Criomorphus firmatus Emeljanov, 1977
 Criomorphus inconspicuus (Uhler, 1877)
 Criomorphus moestus (Boheman, 1847)
 Criomorphus niger Ding & Zhang, 1994
 Criomorphus nigerrimus Dlabola, 1965
 Criomorphus ovis Anufriev & Averkin, 1982
 Criomorphus wilhelmi Anufriev & Averkin, 1982
 Criomorphus williamsi China, 1939

References

Further reading

External links

 

Delphacinae
Articles created by Qbugbot
Auchenorrhyncha genera